Man in India is a journal on anthropology with a focus on South Asia. Its scope includes biological and sociocultural anthropology, archaeology, linguistics and folk-culture. It is currently published by Serials Publications Pvt. Ltd., a publisher listed on Beall's list of predatory publishers before it was taken down in 2017.

History
It is the first anthropological journal to have been started in India and was started by Sarat Chandra Roy in 1921.

It was edited by Nirmal Kumar Bose from 1951 to 1972. Dr. Sumahan Bandyopadhyay is the present editor of this international journal.

References

Anthropology journals
Indology journals
English-language journals
Publications established in 1921